The Wehra Dam is a dam which impounds the River Wehra near Wehr in the county of Waldshut in the German state of Baden-Württemberg.  Its reservoir forms the lower basin of the Hornberg stage (Wehr Power Station) and it is thus part of the Schluchseewerk network. The upper basin of the pumped-storage power station is the Hornberg Basin; the cavern with its power station lies inside the mountain about half way between the two basins.

See also 

List of dams in Germany

References

Literature 
Peter Franke, Wolfgang Frey: Talsperren in der Bundesrepublik Deutschland. DNK – DVWK 1987, .

1970s architecture
Pumped-storage hydroelectric power stations in Germany
Dams in Baden-Württemberg
Waldshut (district)
Baden